Beaconsfield is an Australian television film produced for Nine Network. The film is a dramatisation of the 2006 Beaconsfield Mine collapse. It premiered on Nine Network on 22 April 2012.

References

External links

2012 television films
2012 films
Nine Network original programming
Australian drama television films
Films set in Tasmania